Sur Nava Dhyas Nava is an Indian Marathi language singing reality show. It started airing on Colors Marathi from 13 November 2017 with 5 seasons.

Season summary 
{| class="wikitable"
!Year
!Season
!Host
!Judge
!Winner
!Runner-up
|-
|2017-2018
|Season 1
|
 Tejashri Pradhan
 Pushkaraj Chirputkar
|
 Avadhoot Gupte
 Mahesh Kale
 Shalmali Kholgade
|Aniruddha Joshi
|Vishwajeet Borwankar
|-
|2018-2019
|Chhote Surveer
|Spruha Joshi
|
 Avadhoot Gupte
 Mahesh Kale
 Shalmali Kholgade
|Swarali Jadhav
|Meera Nilakhe
|-
|2019-2020
|Season 3
|
 Spruha Joshi
 Pushkar Jog
|
 Avadhoot Gupte
 Mahesh Kale
|Akshaya Iyer
|Raju Nadaf
|-
|2021
|Asha Udyachi (Ladies Special) 
|Spruha Joshi
|
 Avadhoot Gupte
 Mahesh Kale
| Sanmita Dhapte-Shinde
| Sampada Mane
|-
|2022
|Parva Ganyache, Marathi Banyache
|Spruha Joshi
|
 Avadhoot Gupte
 Mahesh Kale
|
|
|}

 Season 1 

First Season  was started on 17 November 2017. This season was hosted Tejashri Pradhan & Pushkaraj Chirputkar. The winner of title of the show was Aniruddha Joshi.

 Team Leaders 
 Avadhoot Gupte
 Mahesh Kale
 Shalmali Kholgade

 Teams Avadhoot Team: Nihira Joshi
 Shamika Bhide
 Jitendra Tupe
 Shrirang Bhave
 Dipika Jog-Datar
 Shrinidhi Ghatate (Wild Card)Mahesh Team: Aniruddh Joshi
 Madhura Kumbhar
 Vaishali Mhade
 Pralhad Jadhav
 Dnyanedhwar Meshram 
 Vishwajeet Borwankar (Wild Card)Shalmali Team:''
 Sharayu Date
 Prasenjit Kosambi
 Jaydeep Bagwadkar
 Juili Jogalekar
 Padmanabh Gaikwad

Contestants

Guests
 Shounak Abhisheki
 Anand Shinde
 Sadhana Sargam
 Suresh Wadkar
 Taufiq Qureshi
 Ankush Chaudhari
 Sandeep Khare
 Salil Kulkarni
 Hridaynath Mangeshkar
 Vijay Chavan
 Pyarelal
 Veena Jagtap
 Sachit Patil
 Kavita Lad
 Akshaya Gurav
 Vijay Kathin
 Shrinidhi Ghatate
 Nana Patekar
 Sumeet Raghavan
 Sai Tamhankar
 Swapnil Bandodkar
 Vaishali Samant
 Bhagyashree Limaye
 Sukanya Kulkarni
 Atisha Naik
 Ashutosh Gowariker
 Vaibhav Tatwawaadi
 Vandana Gupte
 Shridhar Phadke
 Rani Mukerji
 Sudesh Bhosle
 Hridaynath Mangeshkar
 Sachin Pilgaonkar

Season 2 - Chhote Surveer 

Sur Nava Dhyas Nava - Chhote Surveer was started on 6 August 2018. This season was hosted by Spruha Joshi. The winner of title of the show was Swarali Jadhav.

Contestants

Guests

Season 3 

Sur Nava Dhyas Nava 3 was started on 9 September 2019. This season was hosted by Spruha Joshi & Pushkar Jog. The winner of title of the show was Akshaya Iyer.

Contestants

Season 4 - Asha Udyachi 

Sur Nava Dhyas Nava - Asha Udyachi was started on 5 April 2021. This season was hosted by Spruha Joshi. It is ladies special season. The winner of title of the show was Sanmita Dhapte-Shinde.

Contestants

Season 5 - Parv Ganyache Marathi Banyache 

Sur Nava Dhyas Nava Season 5 was started on 1 July 2022 and ended on 25 September 2022. This season was hosted by Spruha Joshi.

References

External links 
 Sur Nava Dhyas Nava at Voot

Colors Marathi original programming
Marathi-language television shows
2017 Indian television series debuts
2022 Indian television series endings